The 1937–38 SM-sarja season was played between 5 teams from 3 cities. Each team played 4 games.

SM-sarja Championship 

Ilves wins the 1937–38 SM-sarja championship

References
 Hockey Archives

Liiga seasons
Fin
1937–38 in Finnish ice hockey